Eliseus Williams (2 May 1867 – 13 October 1926), better known by his bardic name "Eifion Wyn", was a Welsh language poet, born at Porthmadog in Caernarfonshire, Wales. The primary school in the town of Porthmadog where he lived is named after him.

His best known volumes are Telynegion Maes a Môr (1906) and Caniadau'r Allt (1927), the latter of which was published posthumously.

References

External links
Welsh Biography Online

Welsh-language poets
Welsh poets
1867 births
1926 deaths
People from Porthmadog